Queensbridge Collective, formerly known as 1111 South Tryon, is a two-building development planned for the South End neighborhood in Charlotte, North Carolina.  It will break ground in early 2023.

History
Brian Dominick's ownership of the site began in 1995 when he purchased the building of the Uptown Cabaret located at 112 East Morehead to convert it to a strip club.  Previously the building was a two-story office building. The club was originally called The Dollhouse.  The 1.1-acre lot of the Ascot Inn, which was built in 1963, was purchased by Dominick for $3.14 million in August 2004, it was previously owned by Boone-based Oscar Investors Management. In December 2004 Brian Dominick and Tom Wicker paid $613,000 for an  parcel that was a former car lot, which gave them control of the entire block.  In July 2007 it was announced that the Uptown Cabaret was under consideration as a possible location for a condo development built by Raleigh based development Lichtin.  Dominick confirmed this inquiry.  However, he did not express that the development was a serious possibility.  In August 2011 Brian Dominick and his investment group demolished the Ascot Inn, located on South Tryon near the Midnight Diner.  At that time Dominick vaguely alluded to plans for a future development.

Chicago developer Riverside Investment & Development Co. in December 2021 paid $35 million for a  site consisting of seven parcels.  At the time of purchase the land was occupied by Midnight Diner and Uptown Cabaret at West Morehead and South Tryon streets, around the same time it was announced the diner would relocate.  During the planning stages there was no word of the Uptown Cabaret opening in another location.

The original plans called for three towers for a project cost of $750 million. The project is designed to link the growing South End neighborhood with Uptown Charlotte, which is why the name Queensbridge Collective was chosen. The name change was revealed in March 2022.

In August 2022, the Midnight Diner announced it would close on September 5, 2022, to have the building moved to 420 E Trade Street. The Trade St site was a surface parking lot prior to the relocation of the Midnight Diner. It was announced that it would take 10 to 14 days to prepare the diner for transport and 45 to 60 days for construction at the new site.  The Midnight Diner was moved to the project site at Carson and South Tryon in 2010 from Kings Mountain.  At 1:30 AM on November 2, 2022 the Midnight Diner was towed by a large truck from 115 E. Carson St. to 420 E. Trade.  The mile journey took 90 minutes.  The entrance to the diner will be moved by a crane within a week, after the building is secure on its new foundation.

In September 2022, Riverside announced that the development has been changed to consist of 2 buildings instead of 3. The 42-story office building remained unchanged however the 2-apartment towers were merged into 1 larger building.  The residential tower will be 45 stories and contain 400 units.  After announcing the 3 buildings in March 2022 a geological survey revealed the site water table was higher than originally thought.  Therefore, eliminating 1 of the 2 residential towers allowed an above ground parking structure to be created.  The parking structure will be on stories 2 through 9 and consist of 2,000 spots.

Part of the new development will be road improvements. Riverside worked with Charlotte's transportation and planning departments to determine the best improvements.  Morehead Square Drive, South Tryon, East Morehead St, and East Carson will be widened.  Also, new bike lanes and pedestrian crossings, along with a connection to the Carson Boulevard light rail stop, will be added.  Also, the College Street Connector will be destroyed, it's possible a new connector will be created.

In March 2023 building permits were issued for the office and residential towers' foundation, footing, superstructure, and parking garage.  Uptown Cabaret is currently still active on the site and will be demolished to make room for the development.   However, no date has been set for Uptown Cabaret's closing.  It is expected that both towers will break ground within the following two months.

See also
 Uptown Charlotte
 South End
 List of tallest buildings in Charlotte, North Carolina

References

Proposed buildings and structures in the United States
Buildings and structures in Charlotte, North Carolina